Maarat al-Numan, also known as al-Ma'arra, is a city in northwestern Syria,  south of Idlib and  north of Hama, with a population of about 58,008 before the Civil War (2004 census). In 2017, it was estimated to have a population of 80,000, including several displaced by fighting in neighbouring towns. It is located on the highway between Aleppo and Hama and near the Dead Cities of Bara and Serjilla.

Name
The city, known as Arra to the Greeks, has its present-day name combined from the Aramaic word for cave ܡܥܪܗ (mʿarā) and that of its first Muslim governor, Nu'man ibn Bashir al-Ansari, a companion of Muhammad, meaning “the Cave of Nu’man.” The Crusaders called it Marre. There are many towns throughout Syria with names that begin with the word Maarat, such as Maarrat Misrin and Maarat Saidnaya.

History

Abbasids to Fatimids (891–1086)

In 891 Ya‘qubi described Maarrat al-Nu‘man as "an ancient city, now a ruin. It lies in the Hims province." By the time of Estakhri (951) the place had recovered, as he described the city "very full of good things, and very opulent". Figs, pistachios and vines were cultivated. In 1047 Nasir Khusraw visited the city, and described it as a populous town with a stone wall. There was a Friday Mosque, on a height, in the middle of the town. The bazaars were full of traffic.  Considerable areas of cultivated land surrounded the town, with plenty of fig-trees, olives, pistachios, almonds and grapes.

Crusader Ma‘arra massacre (1098)

The most infamous event from the city's history dates from late 1098, during the First Crusade. After the Crusaders, led by Raymond de Saint Gilles and Bohemond of Taranto, successfully besieged Antioch they found themselves with insufficient supplies of food. Their raids on the surrounding countryside during the winter months did not help the situation. By December 12 when they reached Ma‘arra, many of them were suffering from starvation and malnutrition. They managed to breach the city's walls and massacred about 8,000 inhabitants. However, this time, as they could not find enough food, they resorted to cannibalism.

One of the crusader commanders wrote to Pope Urban II: "A terrible famine racked the army in Ma‘arra, and placed it in the cruel necessity of feeding itself upon the bodies of the Saracens".

Radulph of Caen, another chronicler, wrote: "In Ma‘arra our troops boiled pagan adults in cooking-pots; they impaled children on spits and devoured them grilled."

These events were also chronicled by Fulcher of Chartres, who wrote: "I shudder to tell that many of our people, harassed by the madness of excessive hunger, cut pieces from the buttocks of the Saracens already dead there, which they cooked, but when it was not yet roasted enough by the fire, they devoured it with savage mouth."

Among the European records of the incident was the French poem 'The Leaguer of Antioch', which contains such lines as,

Then came to him the King Tafur, and with him fifty score
Of men-at-arms, not one of them but hunger gnawed him sore.
Thou holy Hermit, counsel us, and help us at our need;
Help, for God's grace, these starving men with wherewithal to feed.
But Peter answered, 'Out, ye drones, a helpless pack that cry,
While all unburied round about the slaughtered Paynim lie. 
A dainty dish is Paynim flesh, with salt and roasting due.

 From "The Leaguer of Antioch"

Those events had a strong impact on the local inhabitants of Southwest Asia. The crusaders already had a reputation for cruelty and barbarism towards Muslims, Jews and even local Christians, Catholic and Orthodox alike (the Crusades began shortly after the Great Schism of 1054).

The accuracy of the events described by the contemporary writers have been disputed. The famine and cannibalism are recognised but the torture and killing of Muslim captives for cannibalism by Radulph of Caen are very unlikely since there are no Arab or Muslim records of the events. Had they occurred, they would have undoubtedly been recorded. This has been noted by the BBC Timewatch series, the episode The Crusades: A Timewatch Guide, which included the experts Dr Thomas Asbridge and Muslim Arab historian Dr Fozia Bora, who states Radulph of Caen's description does not appear in Muslim contemporary chronicles.,

Late medieval period
Ibn al-Muqaddam received lands in Maarat al-Nuʿman in 1179 as part of his compensation for yielding Baalbek to Saladin's brother Turan Shah. Ibn Jubayr passed by the town in 1185, and wrote that "Everywhere around the town are gardens... It is one of the most fertile and richest lands in the world". Ibn Battuta visited in 1355, and described the town as small. The figs and pistachios of the town were exported to Damascus.

Syrian Civil War (2011–ongoing)
The town was the focus of intense protests against the government of President Bashar al-Assad on 2 June 2011. On 25 October 2011, clashes occurred between loyalists and defected soldiers at a roadblock on the edge of the town. The defectors launched an assault on the government held roadblock in retaliation for a raid on their positions the previous night. The Free Syrian Army took control in December 2011–January 2012. The regime recaptured it at a later date. On 10 June 2012, the FSA took it back, but the military recaptured it in August. Finally the FSA captured the town again in October after the Battle of Maarat al-Numan (2012).

As the Syrian Civil War followed, the town's strategic position on the road between Damascus and Aleppo made it a significant prize. Starting on 8 October 2012, the Battle of Maarat al-Numan (2012) was fought between the FSA and the government, causing numerous civilian casualties and severe material damage. The town was home to the FSA Division 13.

A hospital in Maarrat al-Nu'man was struck by missiles on 15 February 2016. The hospital was targeted again by Syrian government and Russian planes in April 2017, on 19 September 2017 and in early January 2018. On 19 April 2016, at least 37 people were reportedly killed when the Syrian government launched air strikes on markets. Dozens more were also injured during the attack. In 2016, the town came under the control of HTS, but was also the site of significant civil society protests against HTS in 2016 and 2017. The town's market was bombed in October 2017. The Syrian Liberation Front took the town from HTS (Al-Qaeda) on 21 February 2018.

The Ma'arrat al-Numan market bombing was perpetrated on 22 July 2019. It killed 43 civilians, and injured another 109 people.

On 28 January 2020, Ma'arrat al-Nu'man was successfully captured by government forces during the 5th Northwestern Syria offensive.

Landmarks
Today the city has a museum with mosaics from the Dead Cities, a Friday mosque, a madrassa built by Abu al-Farawis in 1199, and remains of the medieval citadel. The city is the birthplace of the poet Al-Maʿarri (973–1057).

Climate
Maarat al-Numan has a hot-summer Mediterranean climate (Köppen climate classification: Csa).

See also
Great Mosque of Maarat al-Numan

References

Sources

 Amin Maalouf, The Crusades Through Arab Eyes. Schocken, 1989,

External links
 Encyclopedia of the Orient: Crusades
 Utah Indymedia: The Cannibals of Ma`arra
 Telegraph.co.uk: "Syria-bloody-protests-over-the-slaying-of-30-children"

Cities in Syria
 
Archaeological sites in Idlib Governorate